Tanaorhinus viridiluteatus is a species of moth of the family Geometridae first described by Francis Walker in 1861. It is found in Asia, including Taiwan and India.

The wingspan is 48–70 mm.

References

Moths described in 1861
Geometrinae